Claudia Patricia Murillo (born 1993) is a Salvadorian model and beauty pageant titleholder. She was crowned Nuestra Belleza El Salvador 2014 and represented her country at the Miss Universe 2014 pageant. She was coined as the "Mesoamerican Queen" by her fans due to her alluring Native American physical features, as well as her national costume where she portrayed the Siguanaba mythology. Patricia was born in the town of Juayúa, which means "River of purple orchids", in Native American Pipil language. Although Patricia did not place in Miss Universe, she was a fan favorite, gaining much media attention and is considered one of the most memorable Miss El Salvador and Central American beauty queen in recent history due to her beauty and performance.

Career 

Murillo works as a model.

Pageantry 
Murillo was crowned Nuestra Belleza El Salvador Universo 2014 in San Salvador on May 2, 2014. Murillo represented El Salvador at Miss Universe 2014, but Unplaced.

Physical appearance 
Patricia has classic Native American features. She has a tall, slender, statuesque figure, high cheek bones, almond-shaped feline dark bown eyes, big smile, auburn copper skin, long raven-black hair.

References 

1993 births
Living people
Miss Universe 2014 contestants
Salvadoran beauty pageant winners
Miss El Salvador winners